The Pemana Islands are a small chain of islands in the Flores Sea. The islands are administrated as part of the Sikka Regency in East Nusa Tenggara Province, Indonesia.

Description 
The Pemana Islands are a small group of nine islands located in the Flores Sea. The islands lay to the north of Maumere and are accessible by boat. The largest of the islands is Pemana Besar, and the inhabitants of the islands are considered part of the Buginese people.

References 

Islands of Indonesia
Populated places in Indonesia